The Last Killer (Italian: L'ultimo killer, also known as Django the Last Killer) is a 1967 Spaghetti Western movie starring George Eastman and Anthony Ghidra.

Plot
Ramon's father has a small farm and, like all the other poor farmers nearby, he owes money to a rich rancher, landgrabber John Barrett. On his way to deliver money to Barrett, Ramon is ambushed, robbed and beaten unconscious, though he eventually reaches Barrett. While begging Barrett for more time, Ramon recognizes one of the robbers among Barrett's employees. He thinks that Barrett will help him now, but Barrett does not. Instead, Ramon is tortured until he can escape. Before he arrives home, his family is already dead, killed at Barrett's behest. Ramon, determined to exact revenge on Barrett, takes up training as a gunman.

Cast
 George Eastman as Ramón / Chico
 Anthony Ghidra as Rezza / Rocco
 Dana Ghia as Molly - Saloon Owner
 Daniele Vargas as John Barrett
 Mirko Ellis as Stevens
 Gianni Medici as Bart / Burt
 John McDouglas as Il padre di Ramón
 Frank Fargas as Mack McRay
 Fred Coplan as Slim
 Valentino Macchi
 John Mathios
 Anton de Gortes
 Paul Real
 Max Fraser
 Remo Capitani as Barrett henchman
 Giuseppe Castellano as Bearded Barrett's Man
 Amerigo Castrighella as Barrett henchman
 Giulio Maculani as Sheriff

Trivia
The title was changed to Django the Last Killer in some areas in order to capitalize on the success of the 1966 Franco Nero Spaghetti Western Django. However, The Last Killer is not a sequel.

Releases
Wild East released the film as a limited-edition DVD under the title Django the Last Killer in a double feature with Hate Thy Neighbor. Both films are presented in their original aspect ratios.

External links
  

1967 films
1960s Italian-language films
Django films
Films directed by Giuseppe Vari
Films scored by Roberto Pregadio
1960s Italian films